Sin Piedad (Spanish for "No Mercy" or "No Pity", not to be confused with a similarly-titled series of PPV's hosted by WWE) is the collective name of a series of annual lucha libre, or professional wrestling major show promoted by Mexican professional wrestling promotion Consejo Mundial de Lucha Libre (CMLL). The Sin Piedad show is CMLL's end of the year show, held in December. The first show held under the Sin Piedad took place in 2000, although CMLL has traditionally held a major event in December before then. Sin Piedad has been held eleven times so far, with the end of years event in 2005 billed as Juicio Final ("Final Justice") and then 2009 event billed as Sin Salida ("No Escape") instead. In 2008 Sin Pidead was held in August, with no December show being held at all.

Event history
The very first Sin Piedad event produced under that name took place on December 15, 2000 in Arena México, in Mexico City, replacing their regularly produced Friday night CMLL Super Viernes ("Super Friday") show. All subsequent Sin Piedad shows have taken place on Friday nights and all in Arena México, CMLL's "home arena". As of the 2012 show a total of 145 wrestlers have competed in 66 matches spread out over the 11 shows. 115 males 15 female and 15 Mini-Estrella competitors have worked the Sin Piedad shows. Atlantis is the wrestlers with the most Sin Piedad matches, ten in total or 91% of all shows so far. Marcela is the female wrestler with most matches, five in total, and Pierrothito is the most frequently featured Mini-Estrella with four matches in total. Demus 3:16 has worked under Sin Piedad shows two different ring names, Pequeño Damián 666 and Demus 3:16, while El Sagrado also worked a Sin Piedad show under his previous identity Genético. 77 wrestlers have only wrestled one Sin Pidedad match so far. The 11 shows has hosted 66 matches so far, six on each except for the 2003 show which only had 5 and the 2008 show which had 7 matches.

Twelve of the thirteen shows have featured one or more Lucha de Apuestas, or bet matches, the most prestigious match form in lucha libre. Only the 2012 event did not feature a Luchas de Apuesta match at all and the 2008 Sin Piedad was the only other show to not have a Luchas de Apuestas in the main event, but had one in the semi-main event instead. There has been a total of 16 Luchas de Apuestas matches in Sin Piedad history, with several shows having two such matches. In total three wrestlers lost their masks as a result of a Sin Piedad match; Pequeño Black Warrior, Mictlán and Ángel Azteca. Sixteen wrestlers in thirteen matches, three tag team matches and eight individual matches, have had their hair shaved off as a result of their Sin Piedad matches; El Felino, Mr. Águila, La Amapola, Black Warrior, Rey Bucanero (twice), Kenzo Suzuki, Marco Corleone, Pierroth (twice), Vampiro Canadiense, Brazo de Plata, Emilio Charles Jr.,  Cien Caras, Super Parka and Máscara Año 2000. Sin Piedad has hosted six championship matches, with three championship changes and three successful defenses. There have been two tournament finals held. first in 2003 the final for a tournament to determine the next holders of the Mexican National Trios Championship. in 2012 the main event of the show was the finals of the 2012 La Copa Junior Tournament Final.

Dates, venues, and main events

Sin Piedad Competitors
As of the 2012 Sin Piedad show

Footnotes

References